The inferior cervical ganglion is situated between the base of the transverse process of the last cervical vertebra and the neck of the first rib, on the medial side of the costocervical artery.

Its form is irregular; it is larger in size than the middle cervical ganglion, and is frequently fused with the first thoracic ganglion, under which circumstances it is then called the "stellate ganglion."

Structure
It is connected to the middle cervical ganglion by two or more cords, one of which forms a loop around the subclavian artery and supplies offsets to it. This loop is named the ansa subclavia (Vieussenii).

The ganglion sends gray rami communicantes to the seventh and eighth cervical nerves.

Branches
The inferior cervical ganglion gives off two branches:
 The Inferior cardiac nerve
  offsets to bloodvessels form plexuses on the subclavian artery and its branches. The plexus on the vertebral artery is continued on to the basilar, posterior cerebral, and cerebellar arteries. The plexus on the inferior thyroid artery accompanies the artery to the thyroid gland, and communicates with the recurrent and external laryngeal nerves, with the superior cardiac nerve, and with the plexus on the common carotid artery.

Development
It is probably formed by the coalescence of two ganglia which correspond to the seventh and eighth cervical nerves.

Additional images

See also

 Cervical spine

External links
  - "The Sympathetic Trunk and Cervical Ganglia"

Autonomic ganglia